Begonia sanguinea, the beefsteak begonia or blood-red begonia, is a species of flowering plant in the family Begoniaceae, native to southern Brazil. Valued for the deep red color of the abaxial surface of their leaves, they are easy to propagate from cuttings.

References

sanguinea
Endemic flora of Brazil
Flora of South Brazil
Plants described in 1820